Veho is a British multinational consumer electronics company headquartered in Southampton, England.  Founded in 2007 by Steve Lewis, who is still the CEO, it now has branches worldwide.  Its main products include Muvi camcorders, 360 headphones & speakers, Pebble portable power, Kasa Smart Home and other audio and mobile devices.

From 2014 to 2016, they were sponsors of Premier League football club Southampton F.C.

References

Technology companies of England
2007 establishments in England
Companies based in Hampshire
Southampton F.C.